Benito (Il Giovane Mussolini in Italian) is an Italian TV miniseries regarding the story of Benito Mussolini's early rise to power in the Socialist International and his relationship with Angelica Balabanoff. It was made in 1993 by RTVE of Spain, Rai Due of Italy, Microfilm, and the Kirch Company. It stars Antonio Banderas as Mussolini.

Synopsis
Mussolini arrives in a small town in 1901 and gets a job as a school teacher; he is subsequently fired for having sex with the headmaster's daughter. This would be a common theme throughout the movie. After giving up on teaching, he works as a builder on the new University of Geneva campus building, and where a lover persuades him to become a student. This is also where he organizes his first protest after the death of a worker he knew. For this, he is nearly deported but is saved by Angelica's intervention. After getting run out of then-Austro-Hungarian Trieste, he goes back to his hometown of Forlì, where he marries Rachele. Soon he is at the forefront of the Socialist movement when he becomes the editor-in-chief of Avanti!. At this point Mussolini unites the "reds," the Socialists, with the "yellows," the Republicans in an anti-war movement. This marks the peak of his power, with the Italian left-wing politics under his control. However, he gradually loses his anti-war fervor and splits from the Socialist party altogether, turning all his allies into enemies.

Cast
 Antonio Banderas as Benito Mussolini
 Toni Bertorelli as Primo
 Valentina Lainati as Giulia Ferrari
 Ivano Marescotti as Giacinto Menotti Serrati
 Franco Mescolini as Ferrari
 Anna Geislerová as Eleonora
 Claudia Koll as Rachele Guidi
 Susanne Lothar as Angelica Balabanoff
 Luca Zingaretti as Pietro Nenni

See also     
 List of Italian films of 1993

External links
 

Italian television films
Italian television miniseries
1993 television films
1993 films
Films about Benito Mussolini
Films directed by Gianluigi Calderone
1990s Italian films